Charles Brents Kennamer (November 25, 1874 – June 3, 1955) was a United States district judge of the United States District Court for the Middle District of Alabama and the United States District Court for the Northern District of Alabama.

Education and career

Born in Kennamer Cove, Marshall County, Alabama, Kennamer attended Georgetown University and read law to enter the bar in 1903. He entered private practice in Guntersville, Alabama in 1903. He was county solicitor for Marshall County from 1905 to 1906. He was an Assistant United States Attorney of the Northern District of Alabama from 1907 to 1914, and then a Special Assistant United States Attorney of the Northern District of Alabama from 1914 to 1916, finally becoming the United States Attorney for the Northern District of Alabama from 1922 to 1931.

Federal judicial service

Kennamer was nominated by President Herbert Hoover on January 24, 1931, to a joint seat on the United States District Court for the Middle District of Alabama and the United States District Court for the Northern District of Alabama vacated by Judge Henry De Lamar Clayton Jr. He was confirmed by the United States Senate on February 20, 1931, and received his commission on February 25, 1931. He was reassigned by operation of law to serve only in the Middle District on June 5, 1936. His service terminated on June 3, 1955, due to his death.

References

Sources
 

1874 births
1955 deaths
Georgetown University alumni
United States federal judges admitted to the practice of law by reading law
People from Marshall County, Alabama
Judges of the United States District Court for the Northern District of Alabama
Judges of the United States District Court for the Middle District of Alabama
United States Attorneys for the Northern District of Alabama
United States district court judges appointed by Herbert Hoover
20th-century American judges
Assistant United States Attorneys